The 2020–21 Valparaiso University men's basketball team represented Valparaiso University during the 2020–21 NCAA Division I men's basketball season. Valpo, led by fifth-year head coach Matt Lottich, played their home games at the Athletics–Recreation Center as members of the Missouri Valley Conference. They finished the season 10–18, 7–11 in MVC play to finish a three-way tie for fifth place. As the No. 6 seed in the MVC tournament, they lost to Missouri State in the quarterfinals.

In February 2021, the school officially retired the use of the Crusaders name and mascot due to its use by certain hate groups.

Previous season
The Crusaders finished the 2019–20 season 19–16, 9–9 in MVC play to finish in a tie for sixth place. As the No. 7 seed in the MVC tournament, they defeated Evansville, Loyola–Chicago, and Missouri State to advance to the championship game where they lost to Bradley. All further postseason play was canceled shortly thereafter due to the ongoing COVID-19 pandemic.

Offseason

Departures

Incoming transfers

2020 recruiting class

Roster

Schedule and results

|-
!colspan=9 style=| Regular season
|-

|-

|-

|-

|-

|-

|-

|-

|-
!colspan=12 style=| MVC tournament

Source

References

Valparaiso
Valparaiso Beacons men's basketball seasons
Valparaiso Crusaders men's basketball
Valparaiso Crusaders men's basketball